Samy Baghdadi (born 11 July 1997) is a French professional footballer who plays as a forward for  club Dunkerque.

Career
Born in Grasse, Baghdadi played for Cannet Rocheville, Saint-Étienne II, and Grasse before joining Eredivisie club Fortuna Sittard on a two-year contract with the option of a further year in summer 2021, following a trial period at the club. He made his debut for the club on 14 April 2021 in a 2–1 win over Twente.

On 4 August 2022, Baghdadi returned to France and signed with Dunkerque.

Personal life
Born in France, Baghdadi is of Algerian descent.

References

External links

1997 births
People from Grasse
Footballers from Provence-Alpes-Côte d'Azur
Living people
French footballers
French sportspeople of Algerian descent
Sportspeople from Alpes-Maritimes
Association football forwards
ES Cannet Rocheville players
AS Saint-Étienne players
RC Grasse players
Fortuna Sittard players
USL Dunkerque players
Championnat National 3 players
Championnat National 2 players
Championnat National players
Eredivisie players
French expatriate footballers
Expatriate footballers in the Netherlands
French expatriate sportspeople in the Netherlands